The Moscow–Kazan motorway, designated as the М12, is a highway under construction in the European part of Russia, running between the M7 and M5 highways, serving from the federal city of Moscow to Kazan. Its construction will be finished by 2027 and will cost around 612 billion rubles. On 23 May 2020, it became known that according to the latest plans, it is planned to speed up the construction of the highway and hand it over in 2024. The M12's total length will be 794 km.

History 
On 10 July 2020, Russian Prime Minister Mikhail Mishustin said at a meeting on the construction of the Western Europe – Western China Highway in Yelabuga that the government of Russia had determined the terms of tender procedures and the amount of funding for the construction of the Moscow–Kazan motorway.

On July 27, tenders were announced for the construction of 729 km of the motorway.

On 8 September 2022, the first section of 42,5 km opened and connects the Central Ring Road (ЦКАД) and the Moscow Big Ring.

References 

Roads in Russia